= Vetalwadi =

Village in Maharashtra

Vetalwadi is a small village in Ratnagiri district, Maharashtra state in Western India. The 2011 Census of India recorded a total of 722 residents in the village. Vetalwadi's geographical area is approximately 88 hectares (220 acres).
